Royal Air Force Membury or more simply RAF Membury is a former Royal Air Force station built in the civil parish of Lambourn in Berkshire, England. The airfield also lies immediately next to the Iron Age hill fort of Membury Camp.

Opened in 1942, it was used by both the Royal Air Force (RAF) and United States Army Air Forces (USAAF).  During the war it was used by several combat units with varying missions.  It was also a major supply and maintenance depot.  After the war, it was a private airport until the construction of the M4 motorway in the 1960s when it was closed.

Today the remains of the airfield are located on private property with the former technical site now being an industrial estate (Membury Business Park).

History

USAAF use
Membury was known as USAAF Station AAF-466 for security reasons by the USAAF during the war, and by which it was referred to instead of location.  Its USAAF Station Code was "ME".

3rd Photographic and 67th Observation/Reconnaissance Groups
Meanwhile, the Eighth Air Force VIII Ground Air Support Command, the forebear of the reborn Ninth Air Force had designated Membury for use by its reconnaissance units. These were the men of the 3rd Photographic and the 67th Observation Groups, who arrived at Membury on 7 and 8 September 1942.

The 3rd consisted of the 5th, 12th, 13th, 14th, 15th and 23d squadrons, however the group's air echelons were still in the United States at Colorado Springs AAF, Colorado.  Whilst at RAF Membury, the group was reassigned to the Twelfth Air Force and moved to RAF Steeple Morden in Cambridgeshire during October prior to its movement to North Africa.

The 67th Observation Group arrived at Membury from Esler AAF Louisiana and consisted of the following operational squadrons:
 12th Observation/Reconnaissance Squadron
 107th Observation/Reconnaissance Squadron
 109th Observation/Reconnaissance Squadron
 153rd Observation/Reconnaissance Squadron

 At the time of the transfer to Ninth Air Force, the group was redesignated the 67th Reconnaissance Group.

At the time, the 107th and 109th Squadrons were converting to North American P-51A Mustangs.  However before this was completed, the 107th Squadron was moved to nearby RAF Aldermaston.

6th Tactical Air Depot
During the winter of 1942/1943, the Air Depot site was occupied by the 7th and 16th Air Depot Groups, forming the 6th Tactical Air Depot which specialised in the repair and modification of Republic P-47 Thunderbolt..

366th Fighter Group
In January 1944 the 366th Fighter Group arrived at Membury from Bluethenthal AAF North Carolina. Operational squadrons of the group were:
 389th Fighter Squadron (A6)
 390th Fighter Squadron (B2)
 391st Fighter Squadron (A8)

The 366th was a group of Ninth Air Force's 71st Fighter Wing, IX Tactical Air Command. Before the group could become operational, the unit was moved to RAF Thruxton on 1 March.

436th Troop Carrier Group

The 436th Troop Carrier Group with its Douglas C-47/C-53 Skytrains arrived on 3 March from RAF Bottesford. Operational squadrons of the group were:
 79th Troop Carrier Squadron (S6)
 80th Troop Carrier Squadron (7D)
 81st Troop Carrier Squadron (U5)
 82nd Troop Carrier Squadron (3D)

The 436th TCW was assigned to the 53rd Troop Carrier Wing.

When the 53rd Troop Carrier Wing moved its groups to France in February 1945 the 436th vacated Membury between the 21st and 25th for its new location at Melun (A-55). Nevertheless, there was still a US presence at Membury until a few weeks after the end of hostilities as the airfield was being used by the IX Troop Carrier Command as a pick-up point.

RAF Transport Command use and closure
With the 436th leaving Membury for Melun in France and the Americans departing by the end of June the station was back under RAF control.  In October 1946 when the station was closed and Membury was reduced to care and maintenance status. Much of the 1951 novel Air Bridge by Hammond Innes is set in the closed RAF Membury at the time of the Berlin Airlift, and describes how the decaying airfield and its surroundings looked at that time.

Doctor Who
The airfield was used as the location for a UNIT airfield twice in the shows history, the first time was in the opening episode of the 1971 serial The Daemons and again in the second episode of 1974's Planet of the Spiders.

Current use
Many small industries took over the old buildings on the former Air Depot technical site which are used for light industrial purposes. The former aircraft hangars are used for grain storage.  The former airfield tower stood until 1998 when it was demolished.

Membury is now jointly owned and operated by Southern Sailplanes / Flight Composites, an aircraft repair and maintenance company, and Aviation Enterprises Ltd. 

Since 2008 the site has also been used by Paramotor Training Ltd. A full time Paramotor School

In recent years the remaining runways have had new tarmac strips laid and new aircraft hangars were erected in 2010.

And now the home to White Horse Aviation, a microlight school.

See also

List of former Royal Air Force stations
82nd Airborne Division

References
 (USAAF/USAF)

Citations

Bibliography

 Freeman, Roger A. (1994) UK Airfields of the Ninth: Then and Now 1994. After the Battle 
 Freeman, Roger A. (1996) The Ninth Air Force in Colour: UK and the Continent-World War Two. After the Battle 
 Innes, Hammond, Air Bridge, (London, 1951)

 USAAS-USAAC-USAAF-USAF Aircraft Serial Numbers—1908 to present
 British Automobile Association (AA), (1978), Complete Atlas of Britain,

External links

 http://www.memburyairfield.co.uk
 Photographs of RAF Membury from the Geograph British Isles project
 http://www.ramsburyatwar.com/memburyairfield.htm

Airfields of the VIII Fighter Command in the United Kingdom
Airfields of the IX Troop Carrier Command in the United Kingdom
Royal Air Force stations in Berkshire
Lambourn
Royal Air Force stations of World War II in the United Kingdom